Tokyo-X is a Japanese breed of domestic pig, bred for high quality pork production. It is unusual for its marbled meat, seldom seen in pork.

The Tokyo-X breeding effort was begun in 1990 by the Tokyo Metropolitan Livestock Experiment Station, combining bloodlines from the Duroc (USA), Berkshire (UK), and Beijing Black (China) breeds. Five generations of breeding and selection ended in 1997 when the breed went to market.

Tokyo-X was also featured on the Japanese television program Iron Chef, where the cooks had to use it as an ingredient in each of their dishes.

References

Pig breeds originating in Japan